Caliper or calipers may refer to:

Mechanical devices 
 Calipers (measuring tool)
 Compass (drawing tool), a technical drawing instrument
 Brace (orthopaedic), especially a leg brace 
 Devices for friction-mediated arrest:
 Caliper, the part of a disc brake assembly that squeezes the rotor
 Caliper, the part of a bicycle brake assembly that squeezes the rim

Other senses 
 Caliper, measured (rather than expected) thickness of paper
 Rotating calipers, an algorithm for solving computational geometry problems